Synophis calamitus is a species of snake in the family Colubridae. The species is endemic to northwestern South America.

Geographic range
S. calamitus is found in Pichincha Province, Ecuador.

Description
The holotype of Synophis calamitus, a juvenile female, measures 223 mm (8.8 inches) in total length, which includes a tail of 74 mm (2.9 inches). The back and sides of this specimen are iridescent black. The belly is cream, and the undersurface of the tail is dark gray.

Habitat

Diet
The diet of S. calamitus is unknown.

Reproduction
S. calamitus is oviparous.

References

Colubrids
Snakes of South America
Reptiles of Ecuador
Endemic fauna of Ecuador
Reptiles described in 1990